Days of Nietzsche in Turin is a 2001 biographical-drama Brazilian film directed by Júlio Bressane about the German philosopher Friedrich Nietzsche.

Plot
A cinematographic essay, without dialogues, about the months Friedrich Nietzsche spent in Turin, Italy, with narration quoted by his original writings. It was there that the philosopher wrote some of his most known books such as Ecce Homo and Twilight of the Idols .

Cast
Fernando Eiras as Friedrich Nietzsche
Paulo José
Tina Novelli
Mariana Ximenes
Leandra Leal
Paschoal Villaboin
Isabel Themudo

Awards and nominations

 Cinema Brazil Grand Prize, 2003 (Brazil) - Nominated in category of Best Picture
 Venice Film Festival, 2001 (Italy) - Winner of Filmcritica "Bastone Bianco" Award (Júlio Bressane).
 Candango Trophy, 2001 - Winner of Best Screenplay (Rosa Dias and Júlio Bressane)

See also
 Brazilian films of 2001

External links 
 

2001 films
2000s biographical drama films
Brazilian biographical drama films
2000s Portuguese-language films
Films set in Turin
Films about Friedrich Nietzsche
Films set in 1888
Films set in 1889
Biographical films about writers
2001 drama films
2002 drama films
2002 films